Lamar High School may refer to:
 Lamar High School (Arkansas) in Lamar, Arkansas
 Lamar High School (Colorado) in Lamar, Colorado
 Lamar High School (Missouri) in Lamar, Missouri
 Lamar High School (South Carolina) in Lamar, South Carolina
 Lamar High School (Arlington, Texas) in Arlington, Texas
 Lamar High School (Houston, Texas) in Houston, Texas

Lamar High School might also reference: 
 Lamar Consolidated High School in Rosenberg, Texas
 Lamar School, Meridian, Mississippi